Tobias Nickenig (born 1 August 1984) is a German former professional footballer who played as a defender.

Career

1. FC Köln
Born in Neuwied, Nickenig came through the 1. FC Köln youth system. In the 2005–06 season, he was called up for the first team of 1. FC Köln and he was eventually loaned out to Sportfreunde Siegen in the winter transfer window. After he returned to 1.FC Köln in summer 2007 he was starting for Köln in the first 10 games of the season 2007–08 until a long time injury stopped him – 2 groin operations – and he was out for almost nine months. This season the club finished 1st place and got promoted to the Bundesliga.

He gave his debut in the Bundesliga on 17 December 2008 before he left Köln on 1 January 2009 moving to Liechtenstein-based club FC Vaduz of the Swiss Super League, coached by Pierre Littbarski, former world cup winner 1990.

VfL Osnabrück
After his Vaduz contract ended on 1 July 2009 he signed a one-year contract with VfL Osnabrück on 9 July 2009. In Osnabrück he became one of the outstanding players and an important part of the team that achieved promotion to 2. Bundesliga in 2010.

Later years
After his second year in Osnabrück and a couple of injuries he left the club in 2011 and signed with Turkish side Orduspor which was playing in Süper Lig. There he just had 7 appearances in the first half of the season and after not getting paid he terminated his contract in April 2012.

In July 2012 he signed with German 2. Bundesliga club FC Erzgebirge Aue. There, he again became one of the most important players in the following two seasons and helped the club avoid relegation. On 17 April 2014, he played his last game as a professional footballer in the derby against Dynamo Dresden. In summer 2014, he was one of three players to be released by the club.

He had to retire aged 29 due to knee problems after several operations.

Post-playing retirement
In 2016, Nickenig became sporting director of Thai club Nakhon Ratchasima.

References

External links
 

Living people
1984 births
People from Neuwied
German footballers
Association football defenders
Footballers from Rhineland-Palatinate
1. FC Köln players
1. FC Köln II players
FC Vaduz players
Orduspor footballers
VfL Osnabrück players
FC Erzgebirge Aue players
Süper Lig players
Bundesliga players
2. Bundesliga players
3. Liga players
German expatriate footballers
German expatriate sportspeople in Liechtenstein
Expatriate footballers in Liechtenstein
German expatriate sportspeople in Turkey
Expatriate footballers in Turkey
German expatriate football managers
German expatriate sportspeople in Thailand
Expatriate football managers in Thailand